Monique Guay (born October 27, 1959) is a Quebec politician. She was the Bloc Québécois Member of Parliament for the riding of Rivière-du-Nord.

Born in L'Île-Bizard, Quebec, she was an administrator and businesswoman before she was first elected in 1993 for the riding of Laurentides. She was re-elected in 1997, 2000, and 2004. From 2002 to 2004, she was the Bloc Québécois Caucus Chair. From 2004, she is the Bloc Québécois Deputy House Leader. In the 2011 elections, she was defeated by Pierre Dionne Labelle of the NDP.

References
 

1959 births
Living people
Bloc Québécois MPs
Members of the House of Commons of Canada from Quebec
People from Saint-Jérôme
Women members of the House of Commons of Canada
Women in Quebec politics
People from L'Île-Bizard–Sainte-Geneviève
21st-century Canadian politicians
21st-century Canadian women politicians